Jason Burns (born November 27, 1972) is a former American football running back. He played for the Cincinnati Bengals during the 1995 NFL season. Burns attended Percy L. Julian High School in Chicago, Illinois. He played at the collegiate level with the Wisconsin Badgers.

References

Players of American football from Chicago
Cincinnati Bengals players
Wisconsin Badgers football players
American football running backs
1972 births
Living people